Glenn W. Burton (May 5, 1910 near Clatonia, Gage County, Nebraska – November 22, 2005 Tifton, Georgia) was an American agricultural scientist notable for his pioneering work in plant breeding, development of pearl millet in 1956 and for other contributions that helped increase world food production.

Burton was also known for the development of bermuda grasses used on athletic fields. Of these, his Tifton 419 was the most widely used bermuda grass in the world as of 2006.

Burton received the National Medal of Science from President Ronald Reagan: "For outstanding contributions to the biological sciences that have helped to feed the hungry, protect and beautify the environment, and provide recreation for millions."

Burton was a member of the National Academy of Sciences and chair of the Agronomic Science Foundation.

Education 
Burton received his bachelor's degree from the University of Nebraska-Lincoln in 1932.  He received his master's degree in 1933 and Ph.D. in 1936 from Rutgers University.

Awards
His notable awards, honors and distinctions included:
 1949 - American Society of Agronomy Stevenson Award 
 1949 - Fellow, American Society of Agronomy
 1955 - Honorary D.Sc. degree from Rutgers University
 1962 - Honorary D.Sc. degree from University of Nebraska
 1968 - Agricultural Institute of Canada Recognition Award
 1973 - DuPont Foundation Medal for Distinguished Service to Man
 1975 - Elected to the National Academy of Sciences
 1979 - DeKalb Crop Science Distinguished Career Award
 1980 - USDA Distinguished Service Award
 1980 - Southern Turfgrass Association Honorary Member Award
 1981 - President's Award for Distinguished Federal Civilian Service
 1982 - University of Nebraska Alumni Achievement Award
 1982 - University of Nebraska Master Alumni Award
 1982 - National Medal of Science, presented by President Reagan 
 1984 - Elected into University of Georgia Agricultural Alumni Hall of Fame
 1985 - Fellow, Crop Science Society of America
 1988 - The Alexander von Humboldt Foundation Award
 1988 - Honorary membership in the Grassland Society of Southern Africa
 1994 - Inducted into Georgia Turfgrass Hall of Fame
 1995 - Inducted into Georgia Golf Hall of Fame
 1997 - Inducted into Georgia Cattlemen's Hall of Fame
 1997 - Crop Science Society of America Presidential Award

References 

American agriculturalists
Members of the United States National Academy of Sciences
1910 births
2005 deaths
National Medal of Science laureates
Recipients of the President's Award for Distinguished Federal Civilian Service
Presidents of the American Society of Agronomy
20th-century agronomists